Crescentina may refer to:

 Crescentina modenese, also known as a tigella, a round bread from the Modena area of Emilia-Romagna, Italy
 Gnocco fritto, a bread from the Emilia region of Italy, also called a crescentina